Snowbeast is a 1977 American made-for-television horror film starring Bo Svenson, Yvette Mimieux, Robert Logan and Clint Walker, and follows the story of a bloodthirsty Bigfoot-like monster terrorizing a ski resort in the Colorado Rockies. It was directed by Herb Wallerstein from a teleplay written by Joseph Stefano (The Outer Limits co-creator, who also wrote the screenplay for Alfred Hitchcock's 1960 thriller Psycho). The film originally premiered as the NBC Thursday Night Movie on NBC on April 28, 1977.

Plot
Gar Seberg (Svenson) and his wife Ellen (Mimieux), return to his home town, a ski resort in the Colorado Rockies. Gar is a former Olympic skiing champion, and is looking for work. As they arrive, the town's annual Snow Carnival is spoiled by the disappearance of some vacationers. Resort owner Carrie Rill (Sylvia Sidney), fears losing business and tries to keep the disappearances a secret, but there are witnesses, who say that the culprit is a Yeti or Bigfoot/Sasquatch. As it is revealed that the missing people were brutally killed, the local sheriff (Walker) spreads the story that there is a lone savage bear on the loose. Carrie's grandson Tony (Logan) gives Gar a job at the resort, but also tells him that he must stalk and kill the monster. Ellen was previously in television and had worked on a documentary about Sasquatch sightings, so Gar has an open mind and is reluctant to kill the beast—until he sees the remains of the first victim. Then the monster comes to town, killing the mother of the carnival queen and sending the town into a panic.

Gar, Ellen, Tony and the sheriff go to the woods and track the monster. The creature attacks Gar, who shoots it, but the beast is still alive, so Gar picks up a ski pole and impales it, causing it to fall off the cliff and die.

Cast
 Bo Svenson as Gar Seberg
 Yvette Mimieux as Ellen Seberg
 Robert Logan as Tony Rill
 Clint Walker as Sheriff Paraday
 Sylvia Sidney as Mrs. Carrie Rill
 Thomas Babson as Buster Smith
 Jacquie Botts as Betty Jo Blodgett
 Jamie Jamison as John Cochran
 Richard Jamison as Ben Cochran
 Liz Jury as Mrs. Blodgett
 Richard Jury as Charlie Braintree
 Annie McEnroe as Heidi
 Michael J. London as The Snowbeast

Release

Home media
Snowbeast was released on VHS by GoodTimes Video/Entertainment in August 1987.

Reception

Retrospective reviews
Later reception for Snowbeast has been more negative, with many critics calling it a poor quality Jaws rip-off. 
Fred Beldin of Allmovie felt that the film was a significantly less effective take-off of Stephen Spielberg's Jaws, with the title monster not scary once it is fully revealed. Beldin concluded his review by calling the film "one of the weaker entries into an already tepid horror subgenre." Zack Handlen from The A.V. Club offered the film similar criticism, while also pointing out that director Wallerstein was not as gifted a filmmaker to enable the film to rise above being just another poor Jaws rip-off. HorrorNews.net stated that, while the film showed promise, it was undone by an over-reliance on cliches, POV shots, and ski footage. Leonard Maltin panned the film, calling it "dumb", and "below average". Blockbuster Inc.'s Guide to Movies and Videos awarded it one out of four stars, while refusing to comment about the film. In his Video Sourcebook, Thomson Gale rated the film one and a half out of four stars, stating that the film was 'neither scary or funny'.

Citations

Sources

Books

Websites

Further reading

External links 
 
 
 
 

1977 films
1977 horror films
1977 television films
1970s monster movies
American monster movies
American natural horror films
Bigfoot films
Films based on urban legends
Films scored by Robert Prince
Films set in Colorado
Films shot in Colorado
Films with screenplays by Joseph Stefano
American horror television films
NBC network original films
American skiing films
1970s English-language films
1970s American films